The University of Valle Publishing Program, is the publishing arm of the University of Valle. While its origins can be traced since 1955, when it started operation under the name University of Valle Library, the current publisher was established under Agreement 005 of the University Council on the 29 of April 2002, and it is regulated by Agreement 006 of 2004.  It is a dependency of the Vice-rectory for Research and its editorial board is comprised by the Vice-rectors for Academics and Research, five tenured Professors, and the manager of the program.  The program publishes books and scientific journals, both in print and electronic media with more than 300 titles currently on print.

See also
 List of university presses

Notes

References

External links
 University of Valle Publishing Program official site 

Publishing Program
Book publishing companies of Colombia
Publishing companies established in 2002
University presses of Colombia
Mass media in Cali
2002 establishments in Colombia